The Eye of the Needle is a 1963 Italian comedy-drama film directed by Marcello Andrei.

Cast 
 Gérard Blain: Totò
 Annette Stroyberg: Rosaria Trizzini
 Nino Castelnuovo:  Nicola Badalà
 Mariangela Giordano: Carmelina
 Vittorio Gassman: Lawyer Mazzarò
 Gino Cervi: Lawyer d'Angelo
 Lando Buzzanca: carabiniere Sanfilippo
 Ernesto Calindri: Don Salvatore
 Umberto Spadaro: Don Luigino Trizzini
 Leopoldo Trieste: Don Calogero
 Ignazio Balsamo: Don Nenè
 Carla Calò: Gna' Santa 
 Attilio Dottesio: Judge

References

External links

1963 films
Italian comedy-drama films
1963 comedy-drama films
Films directed by Marcello Andrei
Films scored by Carlo Rustichelli
Commedia all'italiana
Films set in Sicily
Films about rape
1960s Italian films